Erwin Lauper (born 14 June 1946, in Bern) is a Swiss wheelchair curler. He represents Bern CC, and began wheelchair curling in 1981. 

He has competed at all World Championships since his first in 2005, winning two medals and finishing eighth in 2008; he was also part of the Swiss team which finished sixth at the  2006 Paralympics. 

Nationally, he won gold at the Swiss Championships in 2005, bronze in 2006, and gold in 2007.

External links

1946 births
Living people
Swiss male curlers
Swiss wheelchair curlers
Paralympic wheelchair curlers of Switzerland
Wheelchair curlers at the 2006 Winter Paralympics
Swiss wheelchair curling champions
Sportspeople from Bern